There were five special elections for seats in the United States House of Representatives in 2007 to the 110th United States Congress.

Four of the elections were held after the death of the incumbent, while the seat in Massachusetts's 5th congressional district opened up after Marty Meehan resigned to become the Chancellor of the University of Massachusetts Lowell.

In all of these special elections, the incumbent party won.

Summary 

Elections are listed by date and district.

|-
! 
| Charlie Norwood
| 
| 1994
|  | Incumbent died February 13, 2007.New member elected July 17, 2007.Republican hold.
| nowrap | 

|-
! 
| Juanita Millender-McDonald
| 
| 1996 
|  | Incumbent died April 22, 2007.New member elected August 21, 2007.Democratic hold.
| nowrap | 

|-
! 
| Marty Meehan
| 
| 1992
|  | Incumbent resigned July 1, 2007 to become Chancellor of the University of Massachusetts Lowell.New member elected October 16, 2007.Demoratic hold.
| nowrap | 

|-
! 
| Paul Gillmor
| 
| 1988
|  | Incumbent died September 5, 2007.New member elected December 11, 2007.Republican hold.
| nowrap | 

|-
! 
| Jo Ann Davis
| 
| 2000
|  | Incumbent died October 6, 2007.New member elected December 11, 2007.Republican hold.
| nowrap | 

|}

Georgia's 10th congressional district

California's 37th congressional district

Massachusetts's 5th congressional district

Ohio's 5th congressional district

Virginia's 1st congressional district

See also 
 List of special elections to the United States House of Representatives

References

 
2007